Augusta FireBall United, more commonly known as simply Augusta FireBall, was the American soccer team from Augusta, Georgia, founded in 2005. The team was a member of the United Soccer Leagues Premier Development League (PDL), the fourth tier of the American Soccer Pyramid, until 2006, when the team left the league and the franchise was terminated.

The team played its home games at Patriots Park in Columbia County, Georgia. The team's colors were white, black and red.

Final Squad
vs Laredo Heat, 28 July 2006

Year-by-year

Competition history
Augusta Fireball joined the PDL in 2005 as an expansion franchise, and made an immediate splash in the Mid Atlantic division. The team won four of its first five games in competition, including a dominant 6–0 take down of West Virginia Chaos in which Jason McLaughlin and Mark Buchholz scored two goals each, in just their fifth competitive game. Stadium issues meant that Fireball had to play all their home games at the start of the season, and spend the second half of the year on the road; unfortunately, this curious schedule meant that Fireball suffered during the second half of the season, losing heavily on the road to Raleigh Elite, Central Florida Kraze and Carolina Dynamo, although they did come out on top in an astonishing nine-goal thriller against West Virginia Chaos. The team's final day 3–1 loss to the DFW Tornados meant that the Fireball finished their first season fourth behind Richmond Kickers Future, just out of the playoffs. Jason McLaughlin and Ryan Roushandel were the team's joint top scorers, with 7 goals each.

Fireball started 2006 superbly, with an 8-game unbeaten run that included impressive victories, including a 3–2 come-from-behind win over Ajax Orlando Prospects in which Frederico Moojen scored a hat trick, a 4–2 victory on the road over Nashville Metros, and a comprehensive 3–0 win over Atlanta Silverbacks U23's in which Moojen scored another brace. In fact, it was the goalscoring prowess of Moojen which kept Fireball winning all season long. He scored two more goals in Augusta's 3–0 win over Atlanta in the return fixture in early July, and eventually finished the season as the top scorer in the entire PDL, with 18 goals, and was named overall PDL MVP. Despite a 1–0 loss to Carolina Dynamo on the last day of the regular season – only their third of the year – Fireball finished second in the South Atlantic Division, and qualified for the playoffs; their opponents in the Conference semi-finals were Mid South Division champions Laredo Heat, who eventually ran out 3–2 winners, and went on to reach the championship game.

At the end of the season, and despite their considerable on-field success, Augusta's management team announced that they would not be competing in the PDL in 2007.

Coaches
  Massoud Roushandel 2005
  Alec Papadakis 2006

Stadia
 Patriots Park, Columbia County, Georgia 2005–06

Average attendance
 2006: 424
 2005: 600

External links
 Augusta Fireball United

Sports in Augusta, Georgia
Soccer clubs in Georgia (U.S. state)
Defunct Premier Development League teams
Association football clubs established in 2005
Association football clubs disestablished in 2006
2005 establishments in Georgia (U.S. state)
2006 disestablishments in Georgia (U.S. state)
Columbia County, Georgia